The Canton of Algeciras was a national entity that was part of the revolutionary movement in of Algeciras during the First Spanish Republic, known as the cantonalist movement.

History
After the proclamation of the canton of Cádiz on July 19, 1873 and the subsequent adhesion to this of a large number of municipalities on July 22, the Public Health Committee formed by federalist republicans was formed in Algeciras, which dismissed the city council. The proclamation of the independent canton of Algeciras was accepted by the mayor of the city, Francisco Guerrero, in an extraordinary session; the next day a statement was sent to Fermín Salvoechea and other cantonal leaders by Eleuterio Torrelo, who likely belonged to the Federal Republican Committee. The lack of municipal acts during the days that the canton was in force indicates that except for this first act of resignation of the municipal body, no sessions were held by the Health Committee in the city. Among the measures adopted by the Health Committee after the dissolution of the city council, the unblocking of tobacco, the suppression of the Lottery, neighborhood bank notes and pensions as well as the collection of contributions.

Contrary to other cities in the southwest of Andalusia, Algeciras did not show its adherence to the canton of Cádiz but maintained its independence and organized itself autonomously. In this sense, a group of citizens marched in the first days after the proclamation towards the neighboring city of Los Barrios and intended to destroy the bridge that separated both municipalities when they learnt that this city had joined the Cadiz canton. A few days later, a representation from the Public Health Committee left for the neighboring city of Ceuta to request weapons from the military governor of the city. Given this refusal, it was decided in Algeciras to blockade the North African city, preventing the departure of ships from the port to the neighboring city.

Military support for the revolutionary movement in Algeciras was nil during the time it lasted as the military governor of Campo de Gibraltar, General Letendre, did not intervene on either side. Not even when Cádiz fell on August 4 and the volunteers from Algeciras tried to seize the weapons did the Algeciras police force take part in the incidents. The carabinieri troops were quartered in the San García fort until the health committee was dissolved on August 8, when it was learned in the city that General Pavía's troops were near Algeciras. After that, several members of the cantonal city council took refuge in Gibraltar, while others were arrested and later amnestied. On the same day, August 8, the city council was restored with the same councilors who were part of it on July 22.

References

Bibliography 
 
 
 

1873 establishments in Spain
1873 disestablishments in Spain
History of Andalusia
Algeciras